The Toshiba Portégé G500 is a Windows Mobile smartphone produced by Toshiba. Its main feature is its fingerprint scanner, which allows increased security for the device.

Features
The Toshiba G500 runs Windows Mobile 5 for smartphone, on a Marvell Xscale PXA270, 416 MHz processor.
Original operating system is Windows Mobile 5 for smartphone and doesn't has any official update to superior versions. However, there are some user made ROMS which include Windows Mobile 6.5. Using Toshiba G900 IPM drivers, processor can run on 520 MHz frequency. Phone has Qualcomm MSM6280 processor as a radio unit. Supported 2G/3G standards:
3G(UMTS) 2100: 1920-2170 MHz
GSM 900 : 880-960 MHz
DCS 1800 : 1710-1880 MHz
PCS 1900 : 1850-1990 MHz

References

Windows Mobile Standard devices